About Vitya, Masha, and Marines is a 1973 Soviet adventure film directed by Mikhail Ptashuk.

Plot 
A boy named Vitya lives with his parents in a military town in which the military unit of the Marine Corps is located. He is friends with the Marines, who show him what honor, courage and masculine character are.

Cast 
 Sergei Svetlitsky as Vitya Kryakin (as Seryozha Svetlitskiy)
 Oksana Bobrovich as Masha Petrova
 Ivan Mykolaichuk as Vakula
 Aleksandr Abdulov as Kozlov
 Tynchylyk Razzakov as Sadyk (as Radzh Razzakov)
 Georgiy Pipya as Giya (as Giga Pipiya)
 Galina Sulima as Yelizaveta Vasilyevna (as Galina Shchevibolk)
 Stanislav Franio as Stas Bokov (as Stasik Franio)
 Zhenya Bliznyuk as Miron
 Edik Orlov as Zhora

References

External links 
 

1973 films
1970s Russian-language films
Soviet adventure films
1970s adventure films